Acanthosaura prasina is a species of agama found in Vietnam.

References

prasina
Reptiles of Vietnam
Reptiles described in 2020
Taxa named by Natalia B. Ananjeva
Taxa named by Sang Ngoc Nguyen
Taxa named by Robert W. Murphy
Taxa named by Nikolai Loutseranovitch Orlov